Monte Rio (Spanish: Monte Río, meaning "River Mountain") is a census-designated place (CDP) in Sonoma County, California along the Russian River near the Pacific Ocean.  The town of Guerneville lies northeast of Monte Rio, and Jenner is to the west.  The population was 1,152 at the 2010 census, up from 1,104 at the 2000 census.  Bohemian Grove is located in Monte Rio.

History

Starting in the 1870s, Monte Rio was a stop on the North Pacific Coast Railroad connecting Cazadero to the Sausalito, California ferry. Redwood lumber from local sawmills was shipped to build San Francisco. After the sawmills left, the area became known as Vacation Wonderland with trains transporting San Franciscans to summer cabins and even a seven-story hotel downtown. Portions of the 1942 Academy Award-winning film Holiday Inn were filmed at the Village Inn Resort in Monte Rio. The trains no longer run, and the area now is mainly inhabited by full year residents.

Despite heavy logging during the second half of the 19th century, the Sonoma Lumber Company preserved a  grove of old-growth redwood trees, which was sold to San Francisco's Bohemian Club in 1899.  The club purchased dozens of other parcels in the area, and now owns , which it uses for its summer retreats.

Geography

Demographics

2010
The 2010 United States Census reported that Monte Rio had a population of 1,152. The racial makeup of Monte Rio was 1,047 (90.9%) White, 10 (0.9%) African American, 6 (0.5%) Native American, 11 (1.0%) Asian, 1 (0.1%) Pacific Islander, 16 (1.4%) from other races, and 61 (5.3%) from two or more races. Hispanic or Latino of any race were 79 persons (6.9%).

The Census reported that 93.6% of the population lived in households and 6.4% lived in non-institutionalized group quarters.

There were 576 households, out of which 85 (14.8%) had children under the age of 18 living in them, 151 (26.2%) were opposite-sex married couples living together, 43 (7.5%) had a female householder with no husband present, 32 (5.6%) had a male householder with no wife present.  There were 42 (7.3%) unmarried opposite-sex partnerships, and 37 (6.4%) same-sex married couples or partnerships. 247 households (42.9%) were made up of individuals, and 61 (10.6%) had someone living alone who was 65 years of age or older. The average household size was 1.87.  There were 226 families (39.2% of all households); the average family size was 2.54.

The population was spread out, with 132 people (11.5%) under the age of 18, 63 people (5.5%) aged 18 to 24, 253 people (22.0%) aged 25 to 44, 528 people (45.8%) aged 45 to 64, and 176 people (15.3%) who were 65 years of age or older.  The median age was 50.7 years. For every 100 females, there were 119.8 males.  For every 100 females age 18 and over, there were 125.2 males.

The homeowner vacancy rate was 3.7%; the rental vacancy rate was 9.1%. 57.0% of the population lived in owner-occupied housing units and 36.5% lived in rental housing units.

2000
As of the census of 2000, there were 1,104 people, 549 households, and 233 families residing in the CDP. The racial makeup of the CDP was 91.76% White, 0.72% African American, 0.54% Native American, 0.72% Asian, 0.09% Pacific Islander, 1.99% from other races, and 4.17% from two or more races. Hispanic or Latino of any race were 7.34% of the population.

There were 549 households, out of which 19.9% had children under the age of 18 living with them, 24.0% were married couples living together, 12.6% had a female householder with no husband present, and 57.4% were non-families. 41.0% of all households were made up of individuals, and 7.7% had someone living alone who was 65 years of age or older.  The average household size was 2.01 and the average family size was 2.75.

In the CDP, the population was spread out, with 18.3% under the age of 18, 5.2% from 18 to 24, 30.3% from 25 to 44, 35.1% from 45 to 64, and 11.2% who were 65 years of age or older.  The median age was 44 years. For every 100 females, there were 110.3 males.  For every 100 females age 18 and over, there were 113.7 males.

The median income for a household in the CDP was $38,299, and the median income for a family was $46,336. Males had a median income of $29,135 versus $28,750 for females. The per capita income for the CDP was $20,262.  About 12.1% of families and 16.0% of the population were below the poverty line, including 22.7% of those under age 18 and none of those age 65 or over.

Government

References

External links

 Monte Rio Central
 Monte Rio Chamber of Commerce
 Monte Rio Community Alliance
 Monte Rio Recreation and Park District

Census-designated places in Sonoma County, California
Census-designated places in California